Patrick Franck N'Tolla (born 30 July 1987) is a Cameroonian professional footballer who plays as a defender.

References

External links
 Profile at footballdatabase.eu

1987 births
Living people
Footballers from Douala
Association football defenders
Cameroonian footballers
Cameroonian expatriate footballers
Expatriate footballers in France
Ligue 1 players
Ligue 2 players
AS Nancy Lorraine players
Louhans-Cuiseaux FC players
Dijon FCO players
Thonon Evian Grand Genève F.C. players
Rodez AF players
FC Le Mont players
US Ivry players
JA Drancy players
Football Club 93 Bobigny-Bagnolet-Gagny players